Columba or Colmcille (7 December 521 – 9 June 597 AD) was an Irish abbot and missionary evangelist credited with spreading Christianity in what is today Scotland at the start of the Hiberno-Scottish mission. He founded the important abbey on Iona, which became a dominant religious and political institution in the region for centuries. He is the patron saint of Derry. He was highly regarded by both the Gaels of Dál Riata and the Picts, and is remembered today as a Catholic saint and one of the Twelve Apostles of Ireland.

Columba studied under some of Ireland's most prominent church figures and founded several monasteries in the country. Around 563 AD he and his twelve companions crossed to Dunaverty near Southend, Argyll, in Kintyre before settling in Iona in Scotland, then part of the Ulster kingdom of Dál Riata, where they founded a new abbey as a base for spreading Celtic Christianity among the pagan Northern Pictish kingdoms. He remained active in Irish politics, though he spent most of the remainder of his life in Scotland. Three surviving early medieval Latin hymns may be attributed to him.

Early life in Ireland
Columba was born to Fedlimid and Eithne of the Cenel Conaill in Gartan, a district beside Lough Gartan, in Tír Chonaill (mainly modern County Donegal) in the north of Ireland. On his father's side, he is claimed as being the great-great-grandson of Niall of the Nine Hostages, a pseudo-historical Irish high king of the 5th century. He was baptised in Temple-Douglas, in the County Donegal parish of Conwal (midway between Gartan and Letterkenny), by his teacher and foster-uncle Cruithnechán.

Columba lived in the small village of Glencolmcille for roughly 5 years, which was named after him. It is not known for sure if his name at birth was Colmcille or if he adopted this name later in life; Adomnán (Eunan) of Iona thought it was his birth name but other Irish sources have claimed his name at birth was Crimthann (meaning 'fox'). In the Irish language his name means 'dove', which is the same name as the Prophet Jonah (Jonah in Hebrew is also 'dove'), which Adomnán of Iona as well as other early Irish writers were aware of, although it is not clear if he was deliberately named after Jonah or not. Columba is also Latin for dove. (See also the bird genus Columba.)

When sufficiently advanced in letters he entered the monastic school of Movilla, at Newtownards, under Finnian of Movilla who had studied at Ninian's "Magnum Monasterium" on the shores of Galloway. He was about twenty, and a deacon when, having completed his training at Movilla, he travelled southwards into Leinster, where he became a pupil of an aged bard named Gemman. On leaving him, Columba entered the monastery of Clonard, governed at that time by Finnian, noted for sanctity and learning. Here he imbibed the traditions of the Welsh Church, for Finnian had been trained in the schools of Saint David.

In early Christian Ireland, the druidic tradition collapsed due to the spread of the new Christian faith. The study of Latin learning and Christian theology in monasteries flourished. Columba became a pupil at the monastic school at Clonard Abbey, situated on the River Boyne in modern County Meath. During the sixth century, some of the most significant names in the history of Celtic Christianity studied at the Clonard monastery. The average number of scholars under instruction at Clonard was said to be 300. Columba was one of twelve students of Finnian of Clonard who became known as the Twelve Apostles of Ireland. He became a monk and eventually was ordained a priest.

Another preceptor of Columba was Mobhí Clárainech, whose monastery at Glasnevin was frequented by such famous men as Cainnech of Aghaboe, Comgall, and Ciarán. A pestilence which devastated Ireland in 544 caused the dispersion of Mobhi's disciples, and Columba returned to Ulster, the land of his kindred. He was a striking figure of great stature and powerful build, with a loud, melodious voice which could be heard from one hilltop to another.

The following years were marked by the foundation of several important monasteries: Derry, at the southern edge of Inishowen; Durrow, County Offaly; Kells, County Meath; and Swords. While at Derry it is said that he planned a pilgrimage to Rome and Jerusalem, but did not proceed farther than Tours. Thence he brought a copy of those gospels that had lain on the bosom of St Martin for the space of 100 years. This relic was deposited in Derry. St Colmcille is also believed to have established a Church on Inishkea North, County Mayo which is named St Colmcille’s Church.

Some traditions assert that sometime around 560 Columba became involved in a quarrel with Finnian of Moville of Movilla Abbey over a psalter. Columba copied the manuscript at the scriptorium under Finnian, intending to keep the copy. Finnian disputed his right to keep it. There is a suggestion that this conflict resulted in the Battle of Cúl Dreimhne in Cairbre Drom Cliabh (now in County Sligo) in 561, during which many men were killed. Richard Sharpe, translator of Adomnán's Life of St. Columba (referenced in the bibliography below) makes a stern caution at this point against accepting the many references that link the battle and Columba's leaving of Ireland, even though there is evidence in the annals that Columba supported his own king against the high king.  Political conflicts that had existed for some time resulted in the clan Neill's battle against King Diarmait at Cooldrevny in 561. An issue, for example, was the king's violation of the right of sanctuary belonging to Columba's person as a monk on the occasion of the murder of Prince Curnan, Columba's kinsman.

Prince Curnan of Connacht, who had fatally injured a rival in a hurling match and had taken refuge with Columba, was dragged from his protector's arms and slain by Diarmaid's men, in defiance of the rights of sanctuary.

A synod of clerics and scholars threatened to excommunicate him for these deaths, but Brendan of Birr spoke on his behalf. Eventually, the process was deemed a miscarriage of justice. Columba's own conscience was uneasy, and on the advice of an aged hermit, Molaise, he resolved to expiate his sense of offence by departing Ireland. The term "exile" is used in some references. This, too, can be disputed, for the term "pilgrimage" is used more frequently in the literature about him. A marker at Stroove Beach on the Inishowen Peninsula commemorates the place where Columba set sail for Scotland. He left Ireland, but through the following years, he returned several times in relationships with the communities he had founded there.

Columba's copy of the psalter has been traditionally associated with the Cathach of St. Columba. In 574/575, during his return for the Synod of Drum Ceat he founded the monastery of Drumcliff in Cairbre, now County Sligo, near the battlefield.

Scotland
In 563, he travelled to Scotland with twelve companions (said to include Odran of Iona) in a wicker currach covered with leather. According to legend he first landed on the Kintyre Peninsula, near Southend. However, being still in sight of his native land, he moved farther north up the west coast of Scotland. The island of Iona was made over to him by his kinsman Conall mac Comgaill King of Dál Riata,  who perhaps had invited him to come to Scotland in the first place. However, there is a sense in which he was not leaving his native people, as the Ulster Gaels had been colonising the west coast of Scotland for the previous couple of centuries. Aside from the services he provided guiding the only centre of literacy in the region, his reputation as a holy man led to his role as a diplomat among the tribes.

There are also many stories of miracles which he performed during his work to convert the Picts, the most famous being his encounter with an unidentified animal that some have equated with the Loch Ness Monster in 565. It is said that he banished a ferocious "water beast" to the depths of the River Ness after it had killed a Pict and then tried to attack Columba's disciple, Lugne (see Vita Columbae Book 2 below). He visited the pagan King Bridei, King of Fortriu, at his base in Inverness, winning Bridei's respect, although not his conversion.  He subsequently played a major role in the politics of the country.

He was also very energetic in his work as a missionary, and, in addition to founding several churches in the Hebrides, he worked to turn his monastery at Iona into a school for missionaries.  He was a renowned man of letters, having written several hymns and being credited with having transcribed 300 books.  One of the few, if not the only, times he left Scotland was towards the end of his life, when he returned to Ireland to found the monastery at Durrow.

According to traditional sources, Columba died in Iona on Sunday, 9 June 597, and was buried by his monks in the abbey he created. However, Dr. Daniel P. Mc Carthy disputes this and assigns a date of 593 to Columba's death. The Annals record the first raid made upon Iona in 795, with further raids occurring in 802, 806, and 825. Columba's relics were finally removed in 849 and divided between Scotland and Ireland.

Legacy

Ireland
In Ireland, the saint is commonly known as Colmcille.

Colmcille is one of the three patron saints of Ireland, after Patrick and Brigid of Kildare.

Colmcille is the patron saint of the city of Derry, where he founded a monastic settlement in c. 540. The name of the city in Irish is Doire Cholm Cille and is derived from the native oak trees in the area and the city's association with Colmcille. The Catholic Church of Saint Colmcille's Long Tower, and the Church of Ireland St Augustine's Church both claim to stand at the spot of this original settlement. The Church of Ireland Cathedral, St Columb's Cathedral, and the largest park in the city, St. Columb's Park, are named in his honour.  The Catholic Boys' Grammar School, St Columb's College, has him as Patron and namesake.

St. Columba's National School in Drumcondra is a girls’ school named after the saint.

St. Colmcille's Primary School and St. Colmcille's Community School are two schools in Knocklyon, Dublin, named after him, with the former having an annual day dedicated to the saint on 9 June.

The town of Swords, Dublin was reputedly founded by Colmcille in 560 AD. St Colmcille's Boys’ National School and St. Colmcille's Girls’ National School, both located in the town of Swords, are also named after the Saint as is one of the local gaelic teams, Naomh Colmcille.

The Columba Press, a religious and spiritual book company based in Dublin, is named after Colmcille.

Aer Lingus, Ireland's national flag carrier has named one of its Airbus A330 aircraft in commemoration of the saint (reg: EI-DUO).

Scotland
Columba is credited as being a leading figure in the revitalisation of monasticism. The Clan Malcolm/Clan McCallum claims its name from Columba and was reputedly founded by the descendants of his original followers. It is also said that Clan Robertson Clan Donnachaidh / Duncan are heirs of Columba. Clan MacKinnon may also have some claim to being spiritual descendants of St Columba as after he founded his monastery on Isle Iona, the MacKinnons were the abbots of the Church for centuries. Sir Iain Moncreiffe of that Ilk speculated that Clan MacKinnon belonged to the kindred of Saint Columba, noting the MacKinnon Arms bore the hand of the saint holding the Cross, and the several Mackinnon abbots of Iona.

The cathedral of the Catholic Diocese of Argyll and the Isles is placed under the patronage of Saint Columba, as are numerous Catholic schools and parishes throughout the nation. The Scottish Episcopal Church, the Church of Scotland,
and the Evangelical Lutheran Church of England also have parishes dedicated to him. The village of Kilmacolm in Renfrewshire is also derived from Colmcille's name.

St Columba's Hospice, a prominent hospice in Edinburgh, is named after the saint.

Poetry 
Columba currently has two poems attributed to him: "Adiutor Laborantium" and "Altus Prosator". Both poems are examples of Abecedarian hymns in Latin written while Columba was at the Iona Abbey.

The shorter of the two poems, "Adiutor Laborantium" consists of twenty-seven lines of eight syllables each, with each line following the format of an Abecedarian hymn using the Classical Latin alphabet save for lines 10–11 and 25–27. The content of the poem addresses God as a helper, ruler, guard, defender and lifter for those who are good and an enemy of sinners whom he will punish.

"Altus Prosator" consists of twenty-three stanzas sixteen syllables long, with the first containing seven lines and six lines in each subsequent stanza. It uses the same format and alphabet as "Adiutor Laborantium" except with each stanza starting with a different letter rather than each line. The poem tells a story over three parts split into the beginning of time, history of Creation, and the Apocalypse or end of time.

Other
As of 2011, Canadians who are of Scottish ancestry are the third largest ethnic group in the country and thus Columba's name is to be found attached to Catholic, Anglican and Presbyterian parishes. This is particularly the case in eastern Canada, apart from French-speaking Quebec.

Throughout the US there are numerous parishes within the Catholic and Episcopalian denominations dedicated to Columba. Within the Protestant tradition the Presbyterian Church (which has its roots in Scottish Presbyterianism) also has parishes named in honour of Columba. Columba is the patron saint of the Roman Catholic Diocese of Youngstown, Ohio. The Cathedral there is named for him.

Iona University, a small Catholic liberal arts college whose main campus is located in New Rochelle, New York, is named after the island on which Columba established his first monastery in Scotland, as is Iona College in Windsor, Ontario, Iona Presentation College, Perth, and Iona College Geelong in Charlemont, Victoria.

There are at least four pipe bands named for him; one each from Tullamore, Ireland, from Derry, Northern Ireland, from Kearny, New Jersey, and from Cape Cod, Massachusetts.

St. Columba's School, one of the most prominent English-Medium schools in India, run by the Irish Christian Brothers, is also named after the saint.

The Munich GAA is named München Colmcilles.

Saint Columba's Feast Day, 9 June, has been designated as International Celtic Art Day. The Book of Kells and the Book of Durrow, great medieval masterpieces of Celtic art, are associated with Columba.

Benjamin Britten composed A Hymn of St Columba for choir and organ in 1962, setting a poem by the saint, on the occasion of the 1,400th anniversary of his voyage to Iona.

Columba is honored in the Anglican communion as well, including by the Church of England and it's American equivalent, the Episcopal Church on 9 June.

Sources
The main source of information about Columba's life is the Life of Columba, a hagiography written by Adomnán, one of Columba's successors at Iona, in the style of "saint's lives" narratives that had become widespread throughout medieval Europe. Both the Life of Columba and Bede (672/673–735) record Columba's visit to Bridei. Whereas Adomnán just tells us that Columba visited Bridei, Bede relates a later, perhaps Pictish tradition, whereby Columba actually converts the Pictish king. Another early source is a poem in praise of Columba, most probably commissioned by Columba's kinsman, the King of the Uí Néill clan. It was almost certainly written within three or four years of Columba's death and is the earliest vernacular poem in European history. It consists of 25 stanzas of four verses of seven syllables each, called the Amra Coluim Chille.

Through the reputation of its venerable founder and its position as a major European centre of learning, Columba's Iona became a place of pilgrimage. Columba is historically revered as a warrior saint and was often invoked for victory in battle.
Some of his relics were removed in 849 and divided between Alba and Ireland. Relics of Columba were carried before Scottish armies in the reliquary made at Iona in the mid-8th century, called the Brecbennoch. Legend has it that the Brecbennoch was carried to the Battle of Bannockburn (24 June 1314) by the vastly outnumbered Scots army and the intercession of Columba helped them to victory. Since the 19th century the "Brecbennoch of St. Columba" has been identified with the Monymusk Reliquary, although this is now doubted by scholars.

In the Antiphoner of Inchcolm Abbey, the "Iona of the East" (situated on an island in the Firth of Forth), a 14th-century prayer begins O Columba spes Scotorum... "O Columba, hope of the Scots".

See also
 Catholic Church in Ireland
 Catholic Church in Scotland
 Celtic Christianity
 Columba College
 Early Christian Ireland
 List of people on stamps of Ireland
 List of saints
 Old High St Stephen's, Inverness
 St Columb's College
 St. Columba's School (disambiguation)
 Sainte-Colombe
 Saint Columba, patron saint archive
 Scoil Colmcille
 Scotland in the Early Middle Ages

References

Notes

Citations

Sources

Further reading

 
 Bullough, Donald A. "Columba, Adomnan, and the Achievement of Iona," Scottish Historical Review 43, 44 (1964–65): 111–30, 17–33.
 
 Finlay, Ian, Columba London: Gollancz, 1979.
 Forbes, Andrew ; Henley, David (2012). Pages from the Book of Kells. Chiang Mai: Cognoscenti Books. ASIN: B00AN4JVI0
 
 
 
 
 McLean,  Scott A. "Columba 521–597," in Reader's Guide to British History (London: Routledge, 2003) online at Credo Reference. Historiography

External links

 CELT: On the Life of Saint Columba (Betha Choluim Chille) (tr. W. Stokes)
 CELT: The Life of Columba, written by Adamnan (tr. W. Reeves)
 
 BBC: St Columba
 The Church of St Michael and All Angels website: St Columba of Iona, Apostle to the Picts
 St Columba on SaintsAlive
 Photo of the birthplace of Columcille at Gartan
 Coláiste Choilm
 St Columba's Church of Ireland in Portadown
 
 http://foundationsirishculture.ie/record/?id=52

Medieval Gaels from Scotland
People from County Donegal
Pictish people
Abbots of Iona
Scottish folklore
6th-century Latin writers
6th-century Irish abbots
6th-century Christian saints
Medieval Irish saints
Medieval Scottish saints
Burials in Iona
Irish expatriates in Scotland
Medieval Irish writers
521 births
597 deaths
Angelic visionaries
6th-century Scottish people
Irish Christian missionaries
Colombanian saints
Christian missionaries in Scotland
Medieval legends
Anglican saints
Poet priests